the 2022 CAFA U-19 Championship was the third edition of the CAFA U-19 Championship, the triennial international youth football championship organised by CAFA for the men's under-19 national teams of Central Asia. Tajikistan hosted the tournament between 3 to 16 August 2022.A total of five teams played in the tournament, with players born on or after 1 January 2003 eligible to participate.

Iran were the defending champions, having won their first title in 2019. They managed to retain the title.

Participating nations
A total of 5 (out of 6) CAFA member national teams entered the tournament.

Did not enter

Venues
Matches were held at the Republic Central Stadium.

Match officials
Referees

  Halim Shirzad
  Mansourian Morteza
  Daiyrbek Abdyldaev
  Sayyodjon Zayniddinov
  Firdavs Norsafarov

Assistant referees

  Sadat Sayed Nangyali
  Ali Ahmadi
  Ismailzhan Talipzhanov
  Farkhod Kuralov
  Bakhtiyorkhuja Shavkatov

Squads

Main tournament 
The main tournament schedule was announced on 27 July 2022.

Player awards
The following awards were given at the conclusion of the tournament:

The ranking for the Top Goalscorer was determined using the following criteria: goals, assists and fewest minutes played.

Goalscorers

References

External links

2022 in Asian football
Sport in Dushanbe

2022 CAFA Under-19 Championship
2022 in Tajikistani football
2022 in youth association football